Yontan  Airfield (also known as Yomitan Auxiliary Airfield) is a former military airfield located near Yomitan Village on the west coast of Okinawa. It was closed in July 1996 and turned over to the Japanese government in December 2006. Today it is home to the Yomitan Village Office and community complex, including baseball fields, running tracks, and community facilities.

During the Battle of Okinawa on April 1, 1945, United States Marine Corps and United States Army forces seized the airfield on the first day of their landing. It was quickly repaired and became the first airfield on Okinawa to be used by the American forces. Later it was developed into a major American base for Army, Marine, and Navy aircraft. The Boeing B-29 Bockscar landed at Yomitan after the atomic bombing of Nagasaki.

Postwar use
After 1947, there were no units permanently assigned to Yontan and the base was used as an auxiliary installation for Kadena Air Base until the mid-1950s. Later it was placed in auxiliary reserve status.

In June 1948, the 170th Airway and Air Communications Service (AACS) Squadron was activated at Yontan to provide air traffic control and communications support for USAF units in Okinawa. Shortly after, the 170th was redesignated as the 1962d AACS Squadron. The unit moved to Kadena AB and redesignated as 1962d AACS Group (later, Communications Group) on 18 February 1955.

By 1950, Yontan was redesignated as a parachute drop training facility because its runways were not suitable for large scale or jet aircraft operations. By that time, local residents were started farming at the airfield with the tacit permission of the Air Force, and there were no fences installed on the base boundaries, except in administrative area. 33 serious off-range drop accidents occurred, including the death of a girl on 2 August 1950 when a fuel tank fell into private house, and an 11 June 1965 accident in which a trailer landed off target crushing a 10-year-old girl who was playing in the family yard.

After the Okinawa reversion in 1972, the Japanese Government continued to make Yomitan Auxiliary Airfield (FAC 6027) available for USFJ requirements. Under the agreement of the 16th U.S.–Japan Security Consultative Committee in 1976, 250.78 acres of land at eastern portions of the airfield were partially returned to the Japanese Government in three release actions; 0.48 acres were released on 14 May 1977, 0.19 acres were released on 31 May 1977, and 250.11 acres were released on 30 April 1978. The remaining 191 acres were transferred from Fifth Air Force to the control of Commander Fleet Activities, Okinawa (COMFLEACTS Okinawa) on 27 July 1978. In addition, control of the Yomitan Auxiliary Airfield passed from COMFLEACTS Okinawa to Commanding General Marine Corps Base Camp Smedley D. Butler on 9 October 1980.

The last parachute drop training was conducted at Yomitan on 19 July 1996. Under the agreement of Special Action Committee on Okinawa (SACO) Final Report, the parachute drop training was relocated to Ie Jima Auxiliary Airfield (FAC 6005). Yomitan was retained as an electromagnetic interference restriction for HF/DF operations at Sobe Communication Site. With the completion of the functional relocation of Sobe Communication Site into Camp Hansen, Yomitan Auxiliary Airfield was completely returned to the Japanese Government and landowners in December 2006.

Major USAAF units assigned to Yontan

In addition to the USAAF units, Yontan Airfield hosted several Naval and Marine Corps air squadrons equipped with F4U Corsairs, PBY Catalinas and F6F Hellcats.

 Headquarters, Seventh Air Force, July 12, 1945 – January 1, 1946
 Headquarters, VII Bomber Command, July 1945 – March 1946

 Headquarters, 38th Bombardment Group
B-25 Mitchell, July 25 – November 22, 1945
 71st Bombardment Squadron, July 25 – November 22, 1945
 405th Bombardment Squadron, July 25 – November 21, 1945
 822d Bombardment Squadron, July 25 – November 22, 1945
 823d Bombardment Squadron, July 25 – November 21, 1945

 41st Bombardment Group Seventh Air Force
 B-25 Mitchell, June 7 – December 13, 1945
 47th Bombardment Squadron, June 7 – December 13, 1945
 48th Bombardment Squadron, June 7 – December 13, 1945
 396th Bombardment Squadron, June 7 – December 13, 1945
 820th Bombardment Squadron, June 7 – December 13, 1945

 494th Bombardment Group Seventh Air Force
 B-24 Liberator, June 24 – December 8, 1945
 373d Bombardment Squadron, July 21 – December 15, 1945
 864th Bombardment Squadron, June 24 – December 13, 1945
 865th Bombardment Squadron, June 24 – December 13, 1945
 866th Bombardment Squadron, June 24 – December 13, 1945
 867th Bombardment Squadron, June 24 – December 13, 1945

 35th Fighter Group Fifth Air Force
 P-51 Mustang, June 28 – October 1945
 39th Fighter Squadron, June 30 – October 10, 1945
 40th Fighter Squadron, June 30 – October 10, 1945
 41st Fighter Squadron, June 30 – October 10, 1945

 312th Bombardment Group Fifth Air Force
 A-20 Havoc August 13 – December 13, 1945
 386th Bombardment Squadron, August 13 – November 28, 1945  (B-32 Dominator)
 387th Bombardment Squadron, August 13 – December 13, 1945
 388th Bombardment Squadron, September – December 13, 1945
 389th Bombardment Squadron, September – December 9, 1945

 413th Fighter Group, Eighth/Twentieth Air Force*
 P-47 Thunderbolt January 29 – October 1946
 1st Fighter Squadron, January 29 – October 15, 1946
 21st Fighter Squadron, January 29 – October 15, 1946
 34th Fighter Squadron, January 29 – October 15, 1946

 507th Fighter Group, Eighth Air Force
 P-47 Thunderbolt, January 29 – May 27, 1946
 463d Fighter Squadron, January 29 – May 27, 1946
 464th Fighter Squadron, January 29 – May 27, 1946
 465th Fighter Squadron, January 29 – May 27, 1946

 51st Fighter Group, Twentieth Air Force
 P-47 Thunderbolt, October 15, 1946 – May 22, 1947
 16th Fighter Squadron, 15 October 1946-22 May 1947
 25th Fighter Squadron, 15 October 1946-22 May 1947
 26th Fighter Squadron, 15 October 1946-22 May 1947

 4th Fighter Squadron (All Weather) (347th Fighter Group), February 20, 1947 – August 19, 1948 (P-61 Black Widow)

 Eighth Air Force was reassigned to Mac Dill AAF, Florida on June 7, 1946. All assigned units in the Pacific were reassigned to Twentieth Air Force that date.

See also
Naval Base Okinawa

References

Maurer, Maurer (1983). Air Force Combat Units Of World War II. Maxwell AFB, Alabama: Office of Air Force History. .
www.pacificwrecks.com
Harding, Stephen, (1993), Flying Terminated Inventory, Wings Magazine, April 1993 edition

External links
Research the Battle of Okinawa Here

http://www.globalsecurity.org/military/facility/yomitan.htm

Installations of the United States Air Force in Japan
Airfields of the United States Army Air Forces in Occupied Japan
Airfields in the Pacific theatre of World War II
Japan campaign
Airports established in 1944
Defunct airports in Japan
Closed installations of the United States Navy